Akmal Nasrullah Mohd Nasir (born 16 September 1986), better known as Akmal Nasir, is a Malaysian politician who has served as the Deputy Minister of Local Government Development in the Pakatan Harapan (PH) administration under Prime Minister Anwar Ibrahim and Minister Nga Kor Ming since December 2022 and the Member of Parliament (MP) for Johor Bahru since May 2018. He is a member of the People's Justice Party (PKR), a component party of the PH opposition coalition. He served as the 4th Youth Chief of PKR from November 2018 to July 2022.

Education background

Akmal Nasir received an education from Iskandar National Primary School and Taman Pelangi National School, Johor Bahru. He then continued his education at the Malay College Kuala Kangsar (MCKK) from 1999 to 2003. During his time at MCKK, he had held several associations and received several academic awards. Among them are:

  SPM Distinguished Student Award 2003. 
  PMR Best Student Award 2001 (Islamic Religion). 
  National Champion of Entrepreneurship Essay Competition 
  Supervisor. 
  President, Fire and Rescue Cadet 
  President, Mathematics Club 
  Expedition climbs Mount Kinabalu, Sabah (up to the summit). 
  Excellent Scholarship Scholarship award after SPM 

Upon graduation, he has received a scholarship to continue his education to the United States. In 2004, he took a year to prepare for the International Education College (INTEC) in Shah Alam.

Upon completion of the preparatory course, he continued his bachelor's degree at the University of Wisconsin-Madison, United States for four years (2005-2009). He has completed his studies in Actuarial Science and Economics, and has also received Dean's List awards in his third year of study.

Political career
Before Akmal Nasir became an MP, he was the founder and director of an NGO called National Oversight and Whistleblowers Centre (NOW) together with Rafizi Ramli. NOW Malaysia is the NGO that was responsible in exposing national financial scandals during the reign of former Prime Minister, Najib Razak. Some of them include alleged corruption in National Feedlot Corporation (NFC) that involved Shahrizat Abdul Jalil and alleged misuse of funds of Malaysian Islamic Economy Development Foundation (YaPEIM).

In the 2018 Malaysian general election, he contested the Johor Bahru parliamentary seat under the ticket of Pakatan Harapan and won a two-way contest against Shahrir Abdul Samad representing Barisan Nasional.

Akmal Nasir had contested the People's Justice Party (PKR) Youth Wing Chief in 2018 party election which he won by securing a narrow victory.

Controversy
In May 2019, Akmal Nasir had caused an uproar when he attended an interfaith breaking fast event at a Sikh gurdwara in Johor Bahru during the Ramadan fasting month for Muslim. He was rebuked by the Sultan Ibrahim of Johor for his insensitive action. However, the Minister in the Prime Minister's Department for Religious Affairs, Mujahid Yusof Rawa had clarify that it is not an issue with Muslims breaking their Ramadan fast at a non-Muslim house of worship and Akmal Nasir's attendance as an MP will only help to foster better ties between the races and eliminate Islamophobia.

Election results

References 

Living people
1986 births
People from Johor
Malaysian people of Malay descent
Malaysian Muslims
People's Justice Party (Malaysia) politicians
Members of the Dewan Rakyat
University of Wisconsin–Madison College of Letters and Science alumni
21st-century Malaysian politicians